The Canelos-Quichua, also known as the Quichua of Pastaza, is an Indigenous people of Ecuador. They are a Lowland Quichua (Runa Shimi) people, inhabiting the province of Pastaza on the banks of the Curaray, Bonbonaza, and Pastaza rivers, in Peru and Ecuador.

Indigenous peoples of the Amazon
Ethnic groups in Ecuador
Ethnic groups in Peru
Indigenous peoples in Ecuador